Anna Haining Bates (née Swan; August 6, 1846 – August 5, 1888), was a Canadian woman famed for her great stature of . She was one of the tallest women ever. Her parents were of average height and were Scottish immigrants.

Early life
Anna Swan was born at Mill Brook, New Annan, Nova Scotia. She was the third of 13 children, all of the others being around average height. From birth she grew very rapidly. On her 12th birthday she measured . She reached her full height three years later.

Swan excelled at literature and music and was considered to be very intelligent. She also excelled at her studies of acting, piano and voice. She played Lady Macbeth in one play.

Circus career
When she was 17, Swan started working with American showman P. T. Barnum. She lived in Barnum's American Museum in New York City, and on 13 July 1865, she nearly burned to death when the museum was destroyed by fire. The stairs were in flames and she was too large to escape through a window. At the time she weighed 384 lb, but she usually weighed 350 lb. (159 kg). Her highest recorded weight was 392 lb. She got help and escaped safely.

Swan later toured the western United States, followed by Europe where she appeared before Queen Victoria. When visiting a circus in Halifax with which Martin Van Buren Bates — another enormously tall person known as the "Kentucky Giant" — was travelling, Swan was spotted by the promoter and hired on the spot. The giant couple became a touring sensation and eventually fell in love; they married on June 17, 1871 in St Martin-in-the-Fields in London. Queen Victoria gave Anna a satin gown and diamond ring, and gave Martin an engraved watch.

Later life
The Bateses retired to Seville, Ohio, where they built a mansion with high ceilings and doorframes. The back part of the house was built an average size for servants and guests.

Bates conceived two children with Martin. While touring in the summer of 1878, Anna was pregnant for the second time. The boy was born on January 18, 1879, and survived only 11 hours. For this he was posthumously awarded a Guinness World Record.

The Bateses resumed touring with the W.W. Cole Circus in the summer of 1879, and again in the spring of 1880. Bates spent her remaining years quietly on the farm that she and her husband owned. She had joined the local Baptist Church in 1877 and attended services with her husband.

Bates died suddenly and unexpectedly of heart failure in her sleep at her home on August 5, 1888, one day before her 42nd birthday.

The cause of her height was never discovered in her lifetime. X-rays were not discovered until 1895, so it could not be ascertained if she had a pituitary tumor.

References

External links
The Anna Swan Digital Collection
A giant of a woman: Anna Haining Swan (Archived 2009-10-25)
A photograph of Swan

1846 births
1888 deaths
Canadian people of Scottish descent
World record holders
People from Seville, Ohio
People from Colchester County
People with gigantism
Pre-Confederation Nova Scotia people
Sideshow performers
Persons of National Historic Significance (Canada)